The RM-90 Blue Scout II was an American sounding rocket and expendable launch system which was flown three times during 1961. It was used for two HETS test flights, and the launch of the Mercury-Scout 1 satellite for NASA. It was a member of the Scout family of rockets.

The Blue Scout II was a military version of the NASA-operated Scout X-1.

Launches
All three launches occurred from Launch Complex 18B at the Cape Canaveral Air Force Station, the same launch pad used for the Blue Scout I. 

The first two launches were successfully conducted on 3 March and 12 April 1961 respectively, using vehicles D-4 and D-5.
They both carried HETS A2 plasma research experiments on suborbital trajectories. 

The third launch was conducted on 1 November, using vehicle D-8, with the Mercury-Scout 1 satellite for NASA, which was intended to reach low Earth orbit. The launch failed after the rocket went out of control, and was destroyed by the range safety officer 43 seconds after liftoff.

References

 

1961 in spaceflight
Blue Scout II